S. K. Abdul Wahab is a Bangladesh Awami League politician and a former Jatiya Sangsad member representing the Jessore-6 constituency.

Career
Wahab was elected to parliament from Jessore-6 as a Bangladesh Awami League candidate in 2008. He served as the whip of the government party in parliament.

References

Living people
Awami League politicians
9th Jatiya Sangsad members
Place of birth missing (living people)
Date of birth missing (living people)
Year of birth missing (living people)